St Martins is a parish in Perth and Kinross, Scotland, just north of the Sidlaws range of hills, about  north-northeast of Perth and  northwest of Balbeggie. The parish is named for Martin of Tours, of Lower Hungary.

The parish is mentioned in William Shakespeare's Macbeth, in a scene in which the title character meets with two witches on a moor in the parish. The location is marked by today's Witches' Stone.

Notable people
William Davidson Bissett, recipient of the Victoria Cross
William Macdonald Mackenzie, architect, was born in the parish

References

Villages in Perth and Kinross